Flower(s) of Evil may refer to:

Books
 Les Fleurs du mal (literal trans. "The Flowers of Evil"), a volume of French poetry published in 1857 by Charles Baudelaire
 The Flower of Evil (manhwa), manhwa by Lee Hyeon-Sook
 The Flowers of Evil (manga), a manga by Shuzo Oshimi with an anime adaptation

Film and TV
 A Flower of Evil, a 1961 South Korean film directed by Lee Yong-min
 Flower of Evil (film), a 1915 Italian film
 Flower of Evil (South Korean TV series), a 2020 South Korean TV series
 Flower of Evil (Philippine TV series), an upcoming Philippine television drama series based on the 2020 South Korean drama series 
 The Flower of Evil (film), a 2003 French film directed by Claude Chabrol
 "Flowers of Evil" (Police Woman), a 1974 episode of Police Woman

Music

Albums
 Flowers of Evil, a 1969 album by Ruth White
 Flowers of Evil (Mountain album), a 1971 album by Mountain
 Flower of Evil (album), a 2008 album by Susanna
 Flowers of Evil (Ulver album), a 2020 album by Ulver

Songs
"Flowers of Evil" by Mountain
"Flowers of Evil" by Ric Ocasek
"Flowers of Evil" by Baron Rojo
"The Flowers of Evil" by Marilyn Manson

See also 
 Les Fleurs du mal (disambiguation)